Buprestina prosternalis is a species of beetles in the family Buprestidae, the only species in the genus Buprestina.

References

Buprestidae genera